Furniss v. Dawson is an important House of Lords case in the field of UK tax. Its full name is Furniss (Inspector of Taxes) v. Dawson D.E.R., Furniss (Inspector of Taxes) v. Dawson G.E., Murdoch (Inspector of Taxes) v. Dawson R.S., and its citation is [1984] A.C. 474, or alternatively [1984] 2 W.L.R. 226.

Its effect was to extend the applicability of The Ramsay Principle.

The Ramsay Principle

The most important background to Furniss v. Dawson was the decision of the House of Lords a few years earlier in W. T. Ramsay Ltd. v. Inland Revenue Commissioners [1982] A. C. 300. In the Ramsay case, a company which had made a substantial capital gain had entered into a complex and self-cancelling series of transactions which had generated an artificial capital loss.

Facts of the case
The facts of the case are of less significance than the general principle which arose from it. However, in summary, they are:

 The three respondents, the Dawsons, were a father and his two sons. They owned two successful clothing companies called Fordham and Burton Ltd. and Kirkby Garments Ltd. (which are together called "the operating companies" throughout  the case).
 A company called Wood Bastow Holdings Ltd. offered to buy the operating companies from the Dawsons, and a price was agreed.
 If the Dawsons had sold the operating companies direct to Wood Bastow the Dawsons would have had to pay substantial capital gains tax ("CGT").
 There was a rule that if a person sold his shares in Company A to Company B, and instead of receiving cash he received shares in Company B, then there was no CGT payable immediately. Instead, CGT would become payable when (if ever) that person later sold his shares in company B.
 With the intention of taking advantage of this rule to delay the payment of CGT, the Dawsons arranged for an Isle of Man company called Greenjacket Investments Ltd. to be formed. (It was intended to become "Company B".)
 The Dawsons sold the operating companies to Greenjacket Investments Ltd. in exchange for the shares of Greenjacket Investments Ltd.
 Greenjacket Investments Ltd. sold the operating companies to Wood Bastow Holdings Ltd.

Arguments
The Dawsons argued:
 that the CGT rule mentioned above worked in their favour and they could not be taxed until such time (if ever) as they sold their shares in Greenjacket Investments Ltd.; and
 that the Ramsay Principle did not apply, since what they had done had "real" enduring consequences.
The tax authorities argued:
 that Greenjacket Investments Ltd. only existed as a vehicle to create a tax saving;
 that the effect of the transaction as a whole was that the Dawsons had sold the operating companies to Wood Bastow Holdings Ltd.;
 that because the intervening stages of the transaction had only been inserted to generate a tax saving, they were to be ignored under the Ramsay Principle, and instead the effect of the transaction should be taxed; and
 that the transaction being "real" (which is to say, not a sham) was not enough to save it from falling within the Ramsay Principle.
The Court of Appeal had given a judgement agreeing with the Dawsons on these points.

The decision
The judgement of the court was given by Lord Brightman. The other four judges (Lord Fraser of Tullybelton, Lord Scarman, Lord Roskill and Lord Bridge of Harwich) gave shorter judgements agreeing with Lord Brightman's more detailed judgement.

The court decided in favour of the Inland Revenue (as it then was: it is now HM Revenue and Customs).

The judgement can be viewed as a battle between:
 extending the principle in the Duke of Westminster's Case (Inland Revenue Commissioners v. Duke of Westminster [1936] A.C. 1); and
 extending the Ramsay Principle; 
two conflicting ideas which could, at their extremes, be expressed as:
 a rule that any taxpayer may organise his affairs in any way he wishes (provided it is legal) so as to minimise tax (Westminster) and
 a rule that a taxpayer will be taxed on the effect of his transactions, not upon the way he has chosen to organise them for tax purposes (Ramsay).

Lord Brightman came down firmly in favour of an extension of the Ramsay Principle. He said that the appeal court judge (Oliver L. J.), by finding for the Dawsons and favouring the Westminster rule, had wrongly limited the Ramsay Principle (as it had been expressed by Lord Diplock in a case called IRC v. Burmah Oil Co. Ltd.). Lord Brightman said:

Oliver L. J. had given considerable weight to the fact that the existence of Greenjacket Investments Ltd. was real and had enduring consequences. At the end of the transaction, the Dawsons did not own the money which had been paid by Wood Bastow Ltd.: instead, Greenjacket Investments Ltd. owned that money and the Dawsons owned Greenjacket Investments Limited. Legally speaking, those are two very different situations. However Lord Brightman saw this as irrelevant. In any case where a predetermined series of transactions contains steps which are only there for the purpose of avoiding tax, the tax is to be calculated on the effect of the composite transaction as a whole.

Consequences
Furniss v. Dawson has had far-reaching consequences. It applies not only to capital gains tax but to all forms of direct taxation. It also applies in some of the jurisdictions where decisions of the English courts have precedential value.

References

House of Lords cases
Taxation in the United Kingdom
1984 in British law
Tax avoidance
1984 in case law
Taxation case law